Jean-Christophe Devaux (born 16 May 1975 in Lyon, Rhône-Alpes) is a French former professional footballer who played as a defender. In his career, he played for Lyon, Servette, Strasbourg, and Reims. He scored the winning goal for Strasbourg with a free-kick in the 2005 Coupe de la Ligue Final against Caen.

References

External links
 
 RC Strasbourg's official site profile

1975 births
Living people
Footballers from Lyon
Association football defenders
French footballers
French people of Polish descent
Olympique Lyonnais players
Servette FC players
RC Strasbourg Alsace players
Stade de Reims players
Ain Sud players
Ligue 1 players
Swiss Super League players
Ligue 2 players
French expatriate footballers
Expatriate footballers in Switzerland
French expatriate sportspeople in Switzerland
French football managers
Ain Sud managers
Lyon La Duchère managers
Championnat National 2 managers